The Filozoa are a monophyletic grouping within the Opisthokonta. They include animals and their nearest unicellular relatives (those organisms which are more closely related to animals than to fungi or Mesomycetozoa).

Three groups are currently assigned to the clade Filozoa:

 Group Filasterea - recently erected to house the genera Ministeria and Capsaspora
 Group Choanoflagellatea - collared flagellates
 Kingdom Animalia - the animals proper

Etymology
From Latin filum meaning "thread" and Greek zōion meaning "animal".

Phylogeny
A phylogenetic tree of Filozoa and its most closely related clades:

Characteristics
The ancestral opisthokont cell is assumed to have possessed slender filose (thread-like) projections or 'tentacles'. In some opisthokonts (Mesomycetozoa and Corallochytrium) these were lost. They are retained in Filozoa, where they are simple and non-tapering, with a rigid core of actin bundles (contrasting with the flexible, tapering and branched filopodia of nucleariids and the branched rhizoids and hyphae of fungi). In choanoflagellates and in the most primitive animals, namely sponges, they aggregate into a filter-feeding collar (made from microvilli, that are also made from actin) around the cilium or flagellum; this is thought to be an inheritance from their most recent common filozoan ancestor.

References

 
Opisthokont unranked clades